Vida de Menina is a 2004 Brazilian drama film. It was the first feature-length fiction film directed by Helena Solberg. The film is an adaptation of Minha Vida de Menina, the diary of Helena Morley.

It won five awards at the 2004 Gramado Film Festival.

Cast 
 Ludmila Dayer as Helena Morley
 Daniela Escobar as Carolina
 Dalton Vigh as Alexandre
 Maria de Sá as Teodora
 Camilo Bevilacqua as Geraldo
 Lolô Souza Pinto as Madge
 Benjamim Abras as Teodomir
 Lígia Cortez as Iaiá

Plot
The film takes place in Diamantina, Minas Gerais in the period following the abolition of slavery in Brazil. It focuses on the life of Helena Morley, an adolescent who tells her daily life in her diary which, when published in the 1950s, became internationally famous.

References

External links

2003 films
Brazilian drama films
2000s Portuguese-language films
Films based on works by Brazilian writers
2003 drama films
Films scored by Wagner Tiso